The 2019 Liga 3 Riau is the third edition of Liga 3 (formerly known as Liga Nusantara) Riau as a qualifying round for the national round of 2019 Liga 3. AS Abadi, winner of the 2018 Liga 3 Riau are the defending champions. The competition began on 3 August 2019.

Format
In this competition, 12 teams are divided into 3 groups of four. The winner will represent Riau in the national round of 2019 Liga 3.

Teams
There are 12 clubs which will participate the league in this season.

Group stage

Group A

Group B

Grup C

Final round

The final round was held in 1–10 Oktober 2019.

Finals

(Aggregate 3-3, Tornado FC Pekanbaru won 4 - 3 on penalties)

References

2019 in Indonesian football
Riau